The Stalinist era is the period of the History of the Soviet Union (1927–1953) under the rule of Joseph Stalin.

Stalinist era or Stalinist Era may also refer to:
Stalinism in Poland
The Stalinist Era, a 2018 book by  David L. Hoffmann